Diodora namibiensis is a species of sea snail, a marine gastropod mollusk in the family Fissurellidae, the keyhole limpets.

Description
Shell rather large for the genus, very thick and solid, between 42.2 and 27.8 mm in length. Apical hole is diodorid in shape, situated to the anterior end of the shell.

Distribution
The species is only known from the type locality, the Bosluis Bay near the Angolese border in northern Namibia.

References

Fissurellidae
Gastropods described in 2011